Seidell is a surname. Notable people with the surname include:

Atherton Seidell (1878–1961), American chemist
Streeter Seidell (born 1982), American comedian, writer, actor, and television host

See also
Seidel (surname)